George Gilbert Swell (5 August 1923 – 25 January 1999) was a college professor, an Indian politician, an ambassador to several countries, a former Deputy Speaker of the Lok Sabha and its member from Shillong in Meghalaya.  Over a span of more than 35 years, he represented India at high levels nationally and internationally.  Though arising from a modest and rural background in far Northeast India, Swell quickly rose to prominence in every field he entered.

Early life
He was born at Laitkynsew Village near Cherrapunji in the present-day state of Meghalaya. He completed his earlier years of schooling at the Ramakrishna Mission School at Cherrapunji. After passing the Bachelor of arts examination from the Scottish Church College, Kolkata, he completed his Master of Arts degree in English from the University of Calcutta in 1946. Within months thereafter, he married a Shillong beauty, Lajopthiaw ("Victorious Conqueror") Lyngdoh, second daughter of Phrolibon Lyngdoh and Wellington Kearney. Soon after, their first child, Lakyntiew ("She Who Has Uplifted Us"), was born (1947), followed by a son, Sanbor, in 1950.  In 1952, they moved to Ethiopia, part of a cadre of instructors recruited to teach in Ethiopia in the early nineteen fifties. Swell taught English at the high school level.  They returned to Shillong in 1956, and G. G. Swell threw himself into his new positions as a professor of English at several Shillong area colleges. It wasn't long before he entered into the political world of the Khasi and Jaintia Hills. His contribution to the formation of the state of Meghalaya, breaking away from the parent state of Assam, is incontrovertible. He, with his wife's uncle, Brington B Lyngdoh, and Stanley Nichols Roy, as well as other community leaders, conducted a fierce campaign for the separate identity of their proposed state which would combine the peoples of the Khasi and Janintia Hills and other tribes from the Garo Hills and adjacent areas. To their credit, the campaign was bloodless, nonviolent and successful. It was not long before G. G. Swell moved into national politics, having earned recognition for his intellect and passion for leadership, and for his principled and ethical way of life.

Political career
He was elected to the Lok Sabha from the Autonomous Districts (Lok Sabha) constituency in 1962, 1967 and 1971 and from the Shillong (Lok Sabha) constituency in 1984 and 1996. He was the Deputy Speaker of the Lok Sabha from 9 December 1969 to 27 December 1970 in the 4th Lok Sabha and again 27 March 1971 to 18 January 1977.

Swell served as India's ambassador to Norway and Iceland from 1977 to 1980 (appointed by PM Moraji Desai), and Burma, 1980 to 1984 (appointed by PM Indira Gandhi). Subsequently, he was appointed as ambassador-designate to Canada, then Spain, but instead chose to return to national political life in India. In 1985, as a member of parliament, he served as the head of the Indian delegation to the United National General Assembly, New York. In 1992 he contested the Indian presidential election as a joint opposition candidate against Shankar Dayal Sharma but lost. He was member of the Rajya Sabha (upper house of Parliament) from Meghalaya during 1990-1996.

The worsening health of his wife, Lajopthiaw, who died in early 1998, was a factor in his withdrawal from political life.

Death 
He died on 25 January 1999. To honor his many years of public service, his daughter, Lakyntiew Lyngdoh Watrous, and his granddaughter, Yarissa Lyngdoh Sommer, established a museum in the town of his birth, Laitkynsew, in 2016.  Through photography, artifacts, and documentary films it depicts the chronology and achievements of his lengthy career.

References

External links
 Official Biographical Sketch in Lok Sabha Website

Meghalaya politicians
Ambassadors of India to Norway
1980
Deputy Speakers of the Lok Sabha
India MPs 1962–1967
India MPs 1967–1970
India MPs 1971–1977
India MPs 1984–1989
India MPs 1996–1997
Ramakrishna Mission schools alumni
Scottish Church College alumni
University of Calcutta alumni
Candidates for President of India
People from East Khasi Hills district
Lok Sabha members from Meghalaya
Rajya Sabha members from Meghalaya
1923 births
1999 deaths